Apostolos Boúglas (Greek: Γεώργιος Μπούγλας; born 16 March 1989 in Trikala) is a Greek road and track cyclist, who last rode for UCI Continental team SP Tableware. He became professional in 2008, and is the older brother of Georgios Bouglas – who like his brother – is a professional cyclist.

Major results

2010
 2nd National Time Trial Championships
2012
 6th Grand Prix Dobrich II
2013
 3rd National Road Race Championships
 8th Overall Grand Prix of Sochi
2014
 1st  National Madison Championships (with Georgios Bouglas)
 2nd National Road Race Championships
 4th Banja Luka–Belgrade I
 4th Grand Prix of Moscow
 10th Mayor Cup

References

1989 births
Living people
Greek male cyclists
Sportspeople from Trikala
21st-century Greek people